Yves Bélanger (born September 30, 1952) is a Canadian former professional ice hockey goaltender.

Early life 
Belanger was born in Baie-Comeau. He played junior hockey in the Quebec Major Junior Hockey League for the Sherbrooke Castors.

Career 
Bélanger was not drafted into the National Hockey League (NHL), but signed with the Cleveland Crusaders of the World Hockey Association. He made his NHL debut during the 1974–75 season with the St. Louis Blues. He was traded along with Bob MacMillan, Dick Redmond and a second‐round selection in the 1979 NHL Entry Draft (23rd overall–Mike Perovich) from the St. Louis Blues to the Atlanta Flames for Phil Myre, Curt Bennett and Barry Gibbs on December 12, 1977. He played parts of two seasons with the Flames. He ended his NHL career with the Boston Bruins during the 1979-80 season.

Career statistics

Regular season and playoffs

References

External links

1952 births
Living people
Atlanta Flames players
Binghamton Dusters players
Boston Bruins players
Canadian ice hockey goaltenders
Denver Spurs players
Ice hockey people from Quebec
Jacksonville Barons players
Kansas City Blues players
People from Baie-Comeau
Philadelphia Firebirds (AHL) players
Providence Reds players
Salt Lake Golden Eagles (CHL) players
Sherbrooke Castors players
St. Louis Blues players
Syracuse Blazers players
Undrafted National Hockey League players